Zaga Christ ( – April 22, 1638), also referred to as Ṣägga Krəstos, Atənatewos, and Lessana Krəstos, was a seventeenth-century Ethiopian man who, after having been imprisoned, claimed to be the son of Emperor Yaˁəqob I of Ethiopia.  Zaga Christ travelled extensively, living in Sudan, Egypt, Palestine, Greece, and later Italy. There he met the Pope and fell in love with the franciscan nun Caterina Massimi,  who he corresponded with from the years of 1633 to 1637 with letters of love written in their own blood.  Zaga Christ died the following year of pleurisy while in France, where the letters were later discovered.

Accounts of his story
There are many accounts of his life story. The French Franciscan friar Eugène Roger met Zaga Christ in Nazareth (then part of Ottoman Empire) and was familiar with his whereabouts from there until his death.  Rèchac's accounts came from an Italian manuscript, written by Zaga Christ himself when he was living in Rome. The Catholic Patriarch of Ethiopia, Afonso Mendes, devoted a letter in 1638 to disputing his claims of royal birth.

Early Age
Depending on the author, Zaga Christ was born between 1610 and 1614.  While he claimed King Yaˁəqob I as his father, it is unlikely as King Yaˁəqob I was killed in 1606 by Susenyos.  He was Christian.  His mother was named Nazarena. He had a brother named Cosme; together they were educated in the town of Aich on the island of Maroűe. He claimed, in 1629, when he alleges his father was killed, that his mother ordered the brothers to split some gold and jewelry between them and flee. Cosme allegedly went south to Monomotapa, ruled by an enemy of Ethiopia, and ultimately to the Cape of Good Hope. Zaga Christ himself went north to the Sennar Kingdom, where he was received in the court of King Orbat. After a falling out with King Orbat over Zaga marrying his daughter, and the threat of death from Susenyos, Zaga left for Cairo. He later left Cairo and arrived in Jerusalem during Lent of 1632, where he was seen by Roger. For security reasons, he then left for Nazareth. He was received into the Catholic Church by Father Paolo da Lodi, then Custodian of the Holy Land.

In Europe
From September 1632 until October 1634, he lived in Rome.  During that time, he met with Catholic church officials in hopes of setting up a mission in Ethiopia and hopefully reclaim the throne.  While many memorandums were written, no final decision was made, due to tensions between various groups in the church and European countries.  The original goal after he left was to go to England, but that fell through, and only made it to Turin, then to Paris in early 1635.  There, he announced he wasn't going back to Ethiopia, but would stay there.  He ordered his servant, Ignazio, to return home, but he died on the way.  Zaga was supported by French Royalty while he lived in Paris. Zaga died of pleurisy on April 22, 1638. He was buried next to a prince of Portugal.  He was buried at Rueil with the epitaph (translated from French) "Here lies the king of Ethiopia\ The original or the copy."

References 

17th-century Ethiopian people
History of Ethiopia